Julia Young (born May 8, 1995) is an American field hockey player for the American national team.

She participated at the 2018 Women's Hockey World Cup.

References

1995 births
Living people
American female field hockey players
Female field hockey defenders
NC State Wolfpack field hockey players
People from Yorktown, Virginia
Pan American Games bronze medalists for the United States
Pan American Games medalists in field hockey
Field hockey players at the 2019 Pan American Games
Medalists at the 2019 Pan American Games